The Zotye Domy X7 (Damai X7) was a mid-size crossover vehicle (CUV) manufactured by Chinese automaker Zotye Auto under the Domy (大迈) product series.

Overview

Revealed during the 2016 Chengdu Auto Show in China, the production version was launched later in October 2016 with prices ranging from 89,900 yuan to 161,900 yuan. Styling is controversial as the Domy X7 heavily resembles the Volkswagen CrossBlue Coupé Concept.

Zotye Domy X7 S 

The Domy X7 S is a sportier trim of the Zotye Domy X7 mid-size crossover vehicle revealed in November 2017. The Domy X7 S features a restyled front fascia and a redesigned tailgate. As of 2018, the model was canceled and the design and platform was sold to Dorcen and renamed to Dorcen G70s.

See also
 Volkswagen CrossBlue Coupé Concept the car that inspired the design of the Domy X7

References

External links

 Zotye Chinese site

Cars of China
Domy X7
Front-wheel-drive vehicles
Cars introduced in 2016
Crossover sport utility vehicles